The Tomstown Dolomite or Tomstown Formation is a geologic formation in Maryland, Pennsylvania, Virginia and West Virginia. It preserves fossils dating to the Cambrian Period.

In Maryland it is described as "Interbedded light gray to yellowish-gray, thin- to thick-bedded dolomite and limestone; some shale layers; gradational contact with Antietam; thickness 200 to 1,000 feet."

See also

 List of fossiliferous stratigraphic units in Maryland
 List of fossiliferous stratigraphic units in Pennsylvania
 List of fossiliferous stratigraphic units in Virginia
 List of fossiliferous stratigraphic units in West Virginia

References

 

Geologic formations of Maryland
Cambrian geology of Pennsylvania
Geologic formations of Virginia
Cambrian West Virginia
Cambrian southern paleotemperate deposits